The 2003 Munster Intermediate Club Hurling Championship was the inaugural staging of the Munster Intermediate Club Hurling Championship since its establishment by the Munster Council.

On 21 March 2004, Bride Rovers won the championship after a 0-14 to 0-11 defeat of Kilruane MacDonaghs in the final at FitzGerald Park, Kilmallock. It remains their only championship title.

Results

Final

External links
 List of Munster Intermediate Club Hurling Champions

2003 in hurling